Shih-Hui Chen is a Taiwanese composer who lives and works in the United States.

Biography
Chen Shih-hui (陳士惠) was born in Taipei, Taiwan, and came to the United States in 1982 to study for a master's degree from Northern Illinois University and a doctoral degree from Boston University. After receiving her DMA in Music Composition, Shih-Hui Chen took a position at the Shepherd School of Music, Rice University  where she is currently Professor of Music Composition and Theory. Chen also serves on Asia Society Texas Center's Performing Arts & Culture Committee and is the director of 21C: Classical, Contemporary, and Cross-Cultural Music Festival at Rice University.

Chen Shih-hui's work has been performed widely throughout the U.S. and abroad, including Taiwan, China, Germany, and Italy. In 1999, she received an American Academy in Rome Prize, a Guggenheim Fellowship in 2000, and a Goddard Lieberson Fellowship from the American Academy of Arts and Letters in 2007.  In 2010, Chen received a Fulbright Fellowship to study traditional Chinese Music, Nanguan music, and music of Taiwanese Indigenous peoples.

Work

Musical style 
Chen Shih-hui composes for orchestra, chamber ensemble, voice, and solo instruments. She also composes music for theater and film.

Her music blends both her Western training and cultural heritage. A citation accompanying her 2007 Goddard Lieberson Fellowship from the American Academy of Arts and Letters states, “Among the composers of Asian descent living in the U.S.A.,Shih-Hui Chen is most successful in balancing the very refined spectral traditions of the East with the polyphonic practice of Western art-music. In a seamless narrative, her beautiful music, always highly inventive and expressive, is immediately as appealing as it is demanding and memorable.”

Selected recent compositions 

Messages from a Formosan Village (2019)
 Echoes from Within: A Musical Response to Cy Twombly for sheng, contrabass and electronics (2018)
 Withhold the Umbrella for Chinese Orchestra (2018)
 Flashback Moments for piano quartet (2018)
 The Pilgrimage for Acapella Chorus (2017)
 Ascending Waves for large orchestra (2017)
 Silvergrass, Cello and Chamber Orchestra or Ensemble (2016)
Ten Thousand Blooms, Falling Petals for Traditional Korean Orchestra or ensemble (2015)
 Fantasia on the Theme of Guanlingsan for Zheng and Chinese Chamber Orchestra or Ensemble (2014, 2015)
 A Plea to Lady Chang’e for Nanguan Pipa and String Quartet or Orchestra (2013, 2014)
 Returning Souls: Four Short Pieces on Three Formosan Amis Legends for Solo Violin or String Quartet (2011, 2013)
 Our Names, for Narrator and Chamber Ensemble (2010)
 Returnings, for Flute, Percussion and Cello (2010)
 Fantasia on the Theme of Plum Blossoms for String Quartet (2007-9)

Distinctions 

 Barlow Endowment Commission (2001). 
 Bunting Institute Fellowship at the Radcliffe Institute for Advanced Study (1996). 
 Fulbright Fellowship (2010) for study of traditional Chinese Music, Nanguan music, and music of the Taiwanese aboriginal people. 
 Fromm Music Foundation Commission (1995). 
 Goddard Lieberson Fellowship, American Academy of Arts and Letters (2007).
 Koussevitzky Music Foundation Commission (2004).
 John Simon Guggenheim Fellowship (2000). 
 Rome Prize, The American Academy in Rome, Italy (1999).

References

External links 
Shepherd School of Music Faculty Biography [Contains performance calendar of Rice University engagements and further information about 21C].
Composer's Website
Composer's SoundCloud
[Video] "Returning Souls" with Formosa Quartet 
[Video] "Echoes from Within: A Musical Response to Cy Twombly"

1962 births
Living people
20th-century classical composers
21st-century classical composers
Taiwanese music educators
Women classical composers
Taiwanese classical composers
Musicians from Taipei
Northern Illinois University alumni
Boston University College of Fine Arts alumni
Rice University faculty
Taiwanese emigrants to the United States
Women music educators
20th-century women composers
21st-century women composers
Fulbright alumni